Stokkøya is an island in the municipality of Åfjord in Trøndelag county, Norway. The  island is located in the Stoksund area of Åfjord. The largest village on the island is Harsvika.

Stokkøya is connected to the mainland by the Stokkøy Bridge between the villages of Harsvika and Revsnes on the mainland. The Linesøy Bridge is being built connecting Stokkøya to the island of Linesøya to the southwest.

Media gallery

See also
List of islands of Norway

References

Islands of Trøndelag
Åfjord